Arifwala  (Punjabi and ) is a city and headquarters of Arif Wala Tehsil of Pakpattan District in the Punjab province of Pakistan. 

It is the 88th largest city in Pakistan.
Arifwala is located to the southwest of Pakpattan.

History
Arifwala was only a village named as chak No. 61/EB. Later, it was called Arifwala because of a Sufi Saint, "Arif Baba", who stayed in the village. His shrine is located in the graveyard of chak shah karam 29 EB. In 1908, the Deputy Governor of Punjab, "Hurbert" founded new city of Arifwala.

Demographics
The population of city in 1998 was 74,174 but according to the 2017 Census of Pakistan, the population has risen to 111,403 with a growth of about 50.19% in 19 years.

Road projects 
The Provincial Development Working Party approved a scheme to rehabilitate a 17km stretch of road from Bahawalnagar to Arifwala for Rs631.246 million in its 7th meeting. The PDWP, chaired by Abdullah Khan Sumbal, also approved seven other road schemes worth a total of Rs9 billion.

References

Cities in Punjab (Pakistan)
Populated places in Pakpattan District